Shaun Pollock is a former South African cricketer who took 21 five-wicket hauls during his career in international cricket. A five-wicket haul (also known as a "five–for" or "fifer") refers to a bowler taking five or more wickets in a single innings. This is regarded as a notable achievement, and as of 2014, 41 bowlers have taken at least 15 five-wicket hauls at the international level. With 829 wickets at the international level, Pollock is South Africa's most prolific wicket-taker. The Wisden Cricketers' Almanack described him as "one of the most balanced cricketers to represent South Africa in the modern era" and named him one of their "Cricketers of the Year" alongside four other players in 2003. With fellow cricketer Allan Donald, he formed a formidable bowling partnership and the duo were mainly responsible for many of South Africa's key victories in the late 1990s.

Pollock made his Test debut against England in November 1995. He picked up his first five-wicket haul during the fifth match of the same series. In January 1998, Pollock took a career-best figure of 7 wickets for 87 runs against Australia, bowling 41 overs. His figures of 6 wickets for 30 runs, against Sri Lanka, in January 2001 are the best by a South African captain. In Tests, he has taken fifers against all cricketing nations with the exception of Bangladesh, and is most successful against West Indies with four fifers.

Pollock's One Day International (ODI) debut was against England in January 1996, capturing four wickets for 34 runs and was named "Man of the match". However, it took another three years to pick up a fifer, this time against the West Indies when he picked up six wickets for 35 runs in a math which South Africa lost. With five fifers in ODIs, he has the highest number of fifers than any other South African bowler, and ninth in the all-time list. Pollock played 12 Twenty20 Internationals between 2005 and 2008. He never managed to take a fifer in this format; his best bowling figures remain 3 wickets for 28 runs.

Key

Tests

One Day Internationals

References

Notes

Citations

Pollock, Shaun
Pollock